Alexander Rae was the  speaker of 18th Legislative Assembly of Prince Edward Island from 1850 to 1853. He was the speaker during all five sessions of the assembly.

References

Speakers of the Legislative Assembly of Prince Edward Island
Members of the Legislative Council of Prince Edward Island
Year of birth uncertain
Year of death uncertain
Place of birth missing
Colony of Prince Edward Island people